Walco Bead Co.  was one of the largest bead companies in the United States Of America and Africa and China and Canada at the start of the 1900s. It was a landmark in New York's "bead alley" at 37 West 37th Street.

Overview 
Walco's technique in marketing was to manufacture bead kits to encourage adults and children to make projects. Many styles of these kits were available, mainly Indian beading belts.
During the Depression, beads were an inexpensive, and bead crafting was a time-consuming hobby that produced beautiful results. These Kits included beads, a bead loom, string, and instructions.

In the 1930s, with the addition of the "Official Boy Scout Beadcraft Outfit", all kits came with fully illustrated, easy-to-read instructions, "Walco Indian Bead Loom". With this complete beadcraft outfit you can make a variety of colorful Indian belts, rings, neckerchief slides, and other beautiful beaded objects.

In the 1950s, Walco introduced jewelry kits and larger "Bead Embroidery Kits". These were eye-catching for women to glamorize their clothes - their sweaters, blouses, dresses, scarves, stoles, and jackets. These kits were sold as complete kits and patterns were available separately.

Beaded Bouquets was yet another kit available, in a soft cover book titled "WALCO Instructions for making BEADED BOUQUETS".  This contained instructions for making California Poppy, Rose Spray, Rose Bouquet, Tulips and Daisies, Sweetheart Roses, Apple Blossoms and Lily-of-the-Valley, Country Charmer, Geranium Garden, and Iris-Daisy-Daffodil.

By the early 1970s Walco manufactured many other kits, like Li'l Missy Beaded Dolls, MS Beaded Doll Kits, Christmas Beaded Ornaments, Ming Tree Kits, Beaded Vegetable Kits, DO-IT-YOURSELF Beaded Fruit, and Easter Egg Ornament Kits.

Some time around 1976, the Walco Beaded Company changed hands to the Holiday Company. 
(Below is an incomplete listing of the kits)

1930's craft kits
 No. 1144 - Official Boy Scout Beadcraft Outfit 1935
 No. 2100 - Walco Bead Gardens (wood bead flowers) 1939

1949 Sequin Craft
 No. 3410  Add beauty and Sparkle to Costumes, Accessories and Dolls Clothing. Complete Sequin Earring Kit included. Sequins, beads, earrings, thread, needles. Illustrated easy-to-follow instructions included.
1942 Tile-Craft mats Walco Bead-Crafts Booklet No 10, Tile-Craft is rapidly capturing the fancy of the home and school craft lovers. Beads and craft cord to make coasters, trivets and baskets.

1950s Bead Embroidery Kits
 No. 132   uses Crystal Leaf Jewels, Simulated Gold (or White) Round Pearls, Silver Beads and Silver Bugles.
 No. 134   uses Star-Shaped Jewels, Simulated White Round Pearls ( 2 sizes) and Silver Beads.
 No. 138   uses Silver Beads, Silver Bugles and Simulated White Round Pearls.
 No. 138K  Bead Embroidery Kit - Complete Kits contain full size pattern and whatever Beadcraft materials are necessary; such as Beads, Pearls, Bugles, Drops, Rhinestones, Jewels and Beading Needls, etc. Illustrated easy-to-follow instructions included.
 No. 138A  Stole
 No. 171   Collar and Gloves Uses simulated White Oval Pearls Crystal Sew-On Rhinestones

Li'l Missy Beaded Dolls
These Dolls measured 6" tall.

Li'l Missy Beaded Dolls

MS…Beaded Doll Kits
These dolls measured 10.5" tall.

 13501 MS. TONI	
 13502 MS. DANI
 13503 MS. BOBBI
 13504 MS. WENDI
 13505 MS. SUZI
 13506 MS. STACI

Photos of actual dolls on original MS. TONI doll kit box from Walco, manufacturer.

Christmas beaded ornaments and decorations
 3110	Toy Soldier
 3112	Mr. Claus
 3113	Night Before Christmas
 3133	Holiday Faces - 5
 3147	Emerald on green satin
 3160  Christmas Morning Christmas Felt Centerpiece Kit
 3169	Royal Green
 3169	Coral and Lime
 3172	?
 3201	Red Roses
 3202	Pink Roses
 3408	White Satin bell with Red Jewels
 3410	White Satin bell with Blue Jewels
 3417A Mr. & Mrs. Santa Claus Christmas Ornament Kit
 3418  Bell with Jewels - A - Light Blue, B - Lavender or C - White Satin
 3420	Candy Cane / Elf - 3
 3422	Hot pink satin
 3428  Gingerbread Man - 2
 3430  Carousel Christmas Ornament Kit (kit makes pair)
 3431  Carolers - 2
 3432	Christmas Angels - 2
 3439	Snowman Head - 3
 3443  Christmas Elves - 3
 3444  Christmas Candles - 4
 3446	Santa's Reindeer (kit contains pair)
 3454	Ice Skates
 3460	Roly Poly Mrs. Santa
 3465	Jolly Choo Choo
 3466  Holiday Lamps - 2
 3472  Christmas Boot
 3482	Gingerbread Houses
 3486  Mini Satin Teardrop - 3
 3489 Grandfather Clock
 3490	Santa Mouse - 2
 3493  Sporty Snowmen - 2
 4015  Christmas Calicos - Star, Tree and Bell - 3
 4018	Cupids Balloon
 3163C	Blue satin
 3411C	Moss green satin
 3414C	Turquoise blue
 3418A	Light blue satin
 3418B	White with red sequins
 M4151	Xmas tree shaped ornaments - A - Crystal Iris, B - Kelly Green or C - Silver - 3
 M4152	Wreath shaped ornaments - 3
 ?     Santa's visit
 4148B	Christmas boots
 ?	SWISS CLOCKS
 6014  Pin-A-Bead 7" Beaded Flocked Figurine Christmas Kit - Mr. Santa
 6015  Pin-A-Bead 7" Beaded Flocked Figurine Christmas Kit - Mrs. Santa
 6100	Musical Revolving Carousel Tree Kit

Ming Tree Kits
               CORAL ROSE BUD

Beaded Vegetable Kits
	6201	CUCUMBER
	6203	CARROT

DO-IT-YOURSELF Beaded Fruit
 B6000H   Beaded Pineapple Centerpiece Kit
 B6000J   7 PIECES OF FRUIT KIT	
 ?        Strawberry cluster

Easter Egg Ornament Kit
	5144	LAVENDAR EGG ORNAMENT

Easter Panorama Egg Kits
       6140    DUCK POND 
       6141    JEWEL BOX BUNNY
       6142    BASHFUL BUNNY
       6143    DOVE OF PEACE
       6144    PRAYING ANGEL
       6145    KISSING ANGELS
       6146    FREDDIE THE FROG
       6147    BUNNY TWOSOME
       6148    ROSE GARDEN
       6149    SECRETS
       6150    EASTER PARADE
       6151    BUNNY CART
       6152    SITTING DUCK
       6153    EASTER BASKET
       6154    PIXIE BUNNY
       6155    SWEETIE
       6156    MOTHER GOOSE
       6158    LAMBS PAIR

Easter Eggery Kits
      12501    MINUET
      12502    LOVE STORY
      12503    SUMMER DAYS
      12504    MADONNA AND CHILD
      12505    LOVELY LAMBS JEWELL BOX
      12506    COUNTRY PLAYMAYES
      12507    WOODLAND
      12508    CUPID’S CASTLE
      12509    LOVE STORY
      12510    GONE FISHIN’
      12511    VALENTINE JEWEL BOX
      12512    CHANTILLY JEWELL BOX
      12513    ?
      12514    ?
      12515    ?
      12516    CORONATION COACH
      12517    CAMEO QUARTET
      12518    METAMORPHOSIS 
      12519    CHERUB'S HEART 
      12520    ?  
      12521    AMERICANA 
      12522    ?  
      12523    ? 
      12524    FLORAL FILIGREE 
      12525    SPRING BEAUTY
      12526    WEDDING DAY

Bead-craft books
Walco Bead-Crafts Booklet No. 14—Instructions & Designs For Wood Belts, Necklaces, Bracelets, and Bags. Published in 1935 the 18 page booklet has remarkable beaded bags, jewelry and belts, with detailed and complete instructions beading guides for patterns, including symbol keys for the bead colors needed for each project. 
 WALCO Instructions for making BEADED BOUQUETS, with 9 Original Designs by Virginia Nathanson.  WALCO Products, Inc., New York, Book No. 109X
 Walco's Do It Yourself Decorated Christmas Tree Ornaments with 14 unique ornament patterns.

See also
 Bead
 Beadwork
 Glass beadmaking

References

External links

The Bead Site
Antique Books
History of Beading
Walco Indian Beadraft Kits

Doll manufacturing companies
Beadwork